Zarafshan, Zarafshon or Zeravshan may refer to:

Populated places
Zarafshan, Tajikistan
Zarafshon, Uzbekistan
Zarafshan Airport

In geographical features
Zeravshan (river), in Tajikistan and Uzbekistan
Zarafshan Range, in Tajikistan and Uzbekistan

In people
Nasser Zarafshan, Iranian novelist and attorney with long imprisonment on grounds of his human rights activities